Moses Turahirwa   is a Rwandan, fashion designer and creative director. He is the founder of Moshions.

Early life and education
Turahirwa was born in Kibogora Village, Nyamasheke District in Western Rwanda. He is the fourth born in a family of five children. He earned his Advanced Diploma in Civil Engineering from Integrated Polytechnic Regional Centre, Rwanda in 2016 and in 2021, he graduated with  a master's degree in Collection Design from Polimoda Fashion School Italy.

Career
In 2015, he started his fashion brand Moshions in Kigali. The first collection was shown at the Kigali Fashion Week, Rwanda. Turahirwa later exhibited his work in Nigeria, South Africa, Namibia and Italy. He has featured in different magazines including Vogue Italia, Jeune Afrique among others. In 2014, he was recognized  as Mr. Integrated Polytechnic for Kigali and  represented Rwanda on the continental beauty pageant as Mr. Africa International.

Awards & Honours
2021: Young Rwandan Achiever Award by Imbuto Foundation
2020: Emerging Made in Rwanda Entreprise of the Year by Rwanda Development Board 
2020: ALL x Accord Campaign Ambassador for Paris Saint Germain 
2018: Rwanda's Best Local Fashion House 
2016: Second Runner-up, Mr Africa International

References

External links

Living people
Rwandan fashion designers
Year of birth missing (living people)